Kyaw Minn (also spelt Kyaw Min; born 20 June 1961) is a Burmese politician who currently serves as a Pyithu Hluttaw member of parliament for Letpadan Township. He is a member of the National League for Democracy. In the 2015 Myanmar general election, he contested the Letpadan Township constituency for a seat in the Pyithu Hluttaw MP, the country's lower house.

Early life and education 
Kyaw Minn was born on 20 June 1961 in Kannarsu Village, Letpadan Township, Bago Region. He graduated with B.Sc (Maths) from Yangon University. His former work is millers.

Political career
He is a member of the National League for Democracy Party, he was elected as a Pyithu Hluttaw MP elected representative from Letpantan
parliamentary constituency.

References

National League for Democracy politicians
1961 births
Living people
People from Bago Region
University of Yangon alumni